Allochiton is an extinct genus of polyplacophoran molluscs. Allochiton became extinct during the Jurassic period.

References 

Jurassic molluscs
Prehistoric chiton genera
Fossils of Italy

Jurassic genus extinctions